Darren Clarke is a Northern Irish golfer.

Darren Clarke may also refer to:

Darren Clarke (baseball) (born 1981), former Major League Baseball pitcher
Darren Clarke (Gaelic footballer), Irish sportsperson
Darren Clarke (snooker player) (born 1970), English snooker player

See also
Darren Clark (born 1965), Australian sprinter